Renu Nakhon is a district (amphoe) of Nakhon Phanom province, northeastern Thailand.

Geography
Neighboring districts are (from the north clockwise) Mueang Nakhon Phanom, That Phanom, Na Kae, and Pla Pak.

History
Renu Nakhon was a mueang which was converted into a district of Nakhon Phanom during the thesaphiban administrative reforms in 1907. In 1917 the district was renamed That Phanom. The historical name of the area was reused when a new minor district (king amphoe) was created on 1 May 1970 with three tambons, Renu, Phon Thong, and Tha Lat, from That Phanom District. The minor district was upgraded to a full district on 21 August 1975.

Administration

Central administration 
Renu Nakhon is divided into eight sub-districts (tambons), which are further subdivided into 91 administrative villages (mubans).

Local administration 
There is one sub-district municipality (thesaban tambon) in the district:
 Renu Nakhon consisting of parts of sub-districts Renu and Phon Thong.

There are eight sub-district administrative organizations (SAO) in the district:
 Renu consisting of parts of sub-district Renu.
 Phon Thong consisting of parts of sub-district Phon Thong.
 Tha Lat consisting of sub-district Tha Lat.
 Na Ngam consisting of sub-district Na Ngam.
 Khok Hin Hae consisting of sub-district Khok Hin Hae.
 Nong Yang Chin consisting of sub-district Nong Yang Chin.
 Renu Tai consisting of sub-district Renu Tai.
 Na Kham  114ft consisting of sub-district Na Kham.

Economy
In Ban Na Kham, a village in the district, 22 artisans spin cotton fiber into yarn and hand-dye it with natural indigo harvested locally. The group produce Indigo Collection sportswear for the Leicester City Football Club. The team is owned by the Thai company, King Power. The blue colour obtained from indigo dyeing, locally known as kram, matches the football team's color. The Indigo Collection, sold at King Power Stadium's Fan Store in Leicester, UK, debuted in May 2018 to strong interest from Leicester fans.

In media
Renu Nakhon is the setting of a Thai country song, (luk thung), titled 'Cold Wind in Renu'). It has been popular since 1970, with new recordings by many performers.

References

External links
amphoe.com

Renu Nakhon